American Dream: The Business Management Simulation is a 1985 video game published by Blue Chip Software.

Gameplay
American Dream: The Business Management Simulation is a game in which the player is a Chief Executive Officer of a robot manufacturing company.

Reception
Steve Estvanik reviewed the game for Computer Gaming World, and stated that "it is an outstanding training tool, especially for data processors and line managers for whom the program can give insight into the broader aspects of businesses in which they work. If you can afford the ticket price you are in for an enjoyable and educational time when you "play" American Dream."

References

External links
Review in Family Computing
Review in 80 Microcomputing
Article in Family Computing
Article in PC Magazine

1985 video games
Business simulation games
DOS games
DOS-only games
Video games developed in the United States
Video games set in the United States